Liv Wilse (née Liv Ingebrigtsen, May 27, 1931 – August 17, 1994) was a Norwegian actress and singer. In the 1950s, she was briefly married to Arve Opsahl and was known as Liv Opsahl; she and Opsahl had a daughter together, Line Janiche Opsahl. She then married Anders Beer Wilse (1930–1990), with whom she ran a photography business.

In the film Troll i ord she performed the song "Elskling" (melody: Jocke Johanson, lyrics: Egil Hagen, arranged by: Egil Monn-Iversen). The song was also recorded by Liv Opsahl with an orchestra conducted by Øivind Bergh, and it was released on the 78-rpm disc Musica A 5009.

Filmography
 1954: Troll i ord
 1954: Kasserer Jensen
 1955: Arthurs forbrytelse
 1957: Peter van Heeren
 1957: Selv om de er små
 1958: Bustenskjold
 1959: Støv på hjernen

Television (Swedish)
 1990: Den svarta cirkeln

References

External links
 
 Liv Wilse at Norsk filmografi
 Liv Wilse at Filmfront

1931 births
1994 deaths
20th-century Norwegian actresses
20th-century Norwegian women singers
20th-century Norwegian singers